Centre For Higher Secondary Education, more commonly known as CHSE, is a Government run Higher Secondary school in Malé, Maldives, which caters only to A' level students. CHSE was inaugurated on 3rd July, 1979, under the name of the Science Education Centre, or SEC, with the aim of producing students qualified enough to enter universities abroad. It currently has over 1500 students and 90 teachers.

History

Establishment of the SEC 
The SEC was established on 3 July 1979 by the former President of Maldives, Maumoon Abdul Gayoom. The school started with just 4 teachers and 47 students, with only 30 of those students sitting for the final examination. Initially, the school only taught A' level physics, chemistry, biology and english. Economics and history were introduced the following year. Today, a wide range of A' level subjects are taught at the institution.

In 2001, the school was renamed to be the Centre for Higher Secondary Education.

School Houses 
In 2004, four school houses were introduced. They are:

Prior to 2004 the student body was divided into the following houses:

Examination Sessions 
Prior to 2017, students sat for their final examinations in June. In 2017, the Ministry of Education announced that they had reached an agreement with Pearson Edexcel to conduct the examinations during October/November. The minister asserted that this was done to ensure students do not get a long break between finishing their Ordinary Levels and starting their A' levels. However, critics allege this is simply a cost-cutting measure. Moreover, because of this change, some student cash-in one or two international A' level subjects in the October session along with HSC subjects and complete their remaining A' level subjects in the next examinations session in January. This involves significant risks to the students, primarily because most universities require students to achieve the target grades in one (A2) sitting and not across two different sittings.

References

External links 

Schools in the Maldives